This is a list of Melbourne Renegades records and statistics in the Big Bash League, an Australian cricket series.

Records

Team records

Result summary versus opponent

Highest totals

Lowest totals

Batting records

Most runs

Highest individual scores

Highest averages 
Minimum 10 innings

Highest strike rates 
Minimum 125 balls faced

Most fifties

Most sixes

Bowling records

Most wickets

Best bowling figures

Best averages
Minimum 10 wickets

Best economy rates
Minimum 150 balls

Partnerships

Highest partnerships by wicket

References

Melbourne Renegades (BBL)